Bitter Suite may refer to:

"Bitter Suite", a song on Marillion's album Misplaced Childhood
Bitter Suite (album), a 1989 album from Hue & Cry
"The Bitter Suite", an episode of Xena: Warrior Princess
"The Bitter Suite", a song on album Years to Burn by Calexico and Iron & Wine
Bitter Suite, UK title of Time Share (2000 film)

See also
Bittersweet (disambiguation)